Federico Óscar Andrada (born 3 March 1994) is an Argentine footballer who plays for Chilean side Deportes La Serena as a forward.

Career
Andrada is a youth exponent from the club River Plate. He made his league debut at 3 June 2013 in a 2-0 away loss against Argentinos Juniors. He replaced Ariel Rojas after 86 minutes. He scored his first league goal on 10 August 2013 against Rosario Central.

In 2018 he moved to Italy and joined Serie B side Bari.

In 2022 he moved to Chile to join Primera División side Deportes La Serena.

References

External links
 Profile at Vélez Sarsfield's official website 
 
 
 

1994 births
Living people
Argentina youth international footballers
Argentine expatriate footballers
Argentine footballers
Argentine Primera División players
Championnat National 2 players
Ligue 1 players
Serie B players
Chilean Primera División players
Club Atlético River Plate footballers
FC Metz players
Atlético de Rafaela footballers
Quilmes Atlético Club footballers
Club Atlético Vélez Sarsfield footballers
S.S.C. Bari players
Unión de Santa Fe footballers
Aldosivi footballers
Atlético Tucumán footballers
Deportes La Serena footballers
Expatriate footballers in France
Expatriate footballers in Italy
Expatriate footballers in Chile
Argentine expatriate sportspeople in France
Argentine expatriate sportspeople in Italy
Argentine expatriate sportspeople in Chile
Association football forwards
Footballers from Buenos Aires